Osbourne Moxey (born 27 August 1978) is a male long jumper from the Bahamas.
Osbourne has 2 kids Lauren and Landon.
In the Bahamas he graduated from St. Augustine's College where he received a scholarship To attend Auburn University, where he earned a degree in Engineering. Moxey was coached by Henry Rolle.

Osbourne has 4 siblings Beverton, Afton, Kendinique, and Donavon.

Career

His personal best jump is 8.19 metres, achieved in August 2002  in San Antonio.

Achievements

External links
 
 Picture of Osbourne Moxey

References

1978 births
Living people
Bahamian male long jumpers
Bahamian male triple jumpers
Bahamian male hurdlers
Bahamian male sprinters
Athletes (track and field) at the 2004 Summer Olympics
Athletes (track and field) at the 2003 Pan American Games
Athletes (track and field) at the 2007 Pan American Games
Athletes (track and field) at the 2006 Commonwealth Games
Olympic athletes of the Bahamas
Pan American Games competitors for the Bahamas
Commonwealth Games competitors for the Bahamas
Auburn Tigers men's track and field athletes
Auburn University alumni